Cocktales is a television show by The Comedy Network. This 10-episode, half-hour series gives an inside look at what some men really talk about behind closed doors. Each week, a rotating panel of males recount what they believe to be their craziest sexual encounters, hilarious pranks and wildest memories.

From high school teachers and computer programmers to city workers and comedians, a varied blend of young men sign on to spill their Cocktales.

References

2010s Canadian comedy television series
CTV Comedy Channel original programming